ARA Isla de los Estados was an Argentine Navy supply ship sunk during the Falklands War.

Ship history
The 3,900-ton ship was built in 1975 by the Sociedad Metalúrgica Duro Felguera in Gijón, Spain, as Trans-Bética. She was acquired by the Argentine Navy, renamed after the island east of Tierra del Fuego, and commissioned into the Naval Transport Service on 22 December 1980, being used to maintain a regular transport service between the Falkland Islands and the mainland.

Falklands war
On 28 March 1982 she sailed from Puerto Deseado to participate in Operation Rosario in the Falkland Islands, arriving on 4 April, three days after the initial landings, to provide transport around the archipelago.

The ship, among many other things, transported troops to occupy Darwin, Goose Green and Fox Bay.

Between 15 and 17 April she sowed mines in the waters surrounding Stanley. These mines had been carried by the ARA Bahia Buen Suceso.

Sinking
Isla de los Estados was sunk by  during the first hours of 11 May 1982 in a surface action north of the Swan Islands in Falkland Sound. Alacrity engaged Isla de los Estados with her 4.5-inch gun. The Argentine transport blew up after several hits ignited her cargo of jet fuel and ammunition. Only two of the 24 men aboard survived; 15 crew members and seven servicemen (from all three armed forces plus the coast guard) were killed or missing.

See also 
 List of auxiliary ships of the Argentine Navy

References

Merchant ships of Spain
Ships built in Spain
1975 ships
Transports of the Argentine Navy
Cold War auxiliary ships of Argentina
Falklands War naval ships of Argentina
Shipwrecks of the Falklands War
Maritime incidents in 1982